Hypophytala nigrescens, the black flash, is a butterfly in the family Lycaenidae. It is found in Nigeria. The habitat consists of forests.

References

Endemic fauna of Nigeria
Butterflies described in 1964
Poritiinae